Jessica Anne Clarke (born 5 May 1989) is an English footballer who plays as a winger or forward for FA Women's Championship club Durham and the England national team. After beginning her career with hometown team Leeds United (known as Leeds Carnegie between 2008 and 2010), Clarke joined Lincoln Ladies in 2010 and remained with the club when it re-branded as Notts County four years later. After six seasons at Notts County, Clarke signed for league rivals Liverpool in April 2017. Since making her senior England debut in 2009, Clarke has won over 50 caps. She has represented her country at two editions of the UEFA Women's Championship and at the 2011 FIFA Women's World Cup.

Club career

Clarke joined Leeds at Under-14 level, progressing through the youth teams to make the senior squad. At the age of 16, Clarke started the 2006 FA Women's Cup final, but conceded a penalty in Leeds' 5–0 defeat by Arsenal. In 2006–07, Leeds reached the final of the FA Women's Premier League Cup. Despite a much improved performance, including a substitute cameo from Clarke, Leeds lost out to an injury–time strike from Arsenal's Jayne Ludlow.

In Leeds' third major final in as many years, Clarke scored a consolation goal in the 2008 FA Women's Cup final – a 4–1 loss to Arsenal. At the fourth time of asking, Clarke started a 3–1 Premier League Cup final win over Everton on 11 February 2010, to help Leeds win their first major silverware.

She signed for FA WSL club Lincoln Ladies alongside several Leeds teammates in August 2010. Lincoln's capture of the "pacy winger" was seen as a major signing for the club.

At the end of the WSL season Clarke joined FA Women's Premier League Northern Division strugglers Leeds City Vixens on loan.

It was announced that Lincoln Ladies FC was to be started as a new football club for the 2014 FA WSL season and would be crossing the border to become Notts County Ladies. Clarke stayed with the team for the move and was a vital player in their season. Scoring many goals during the season and dominating play in her new role as a striker earned Clarke a nomination for FA Women's Players' Player of the Season.

On 25 May 2021 she was released from Liverpool after making 68 appearances overall.

International career
Clarke represented England at Under-15, Under-17 and Under-19 level. At the 2008 FIFA U-20 Women's World Cup in Chile, Clarke's wing–play was a key feature of England's run to the quarter-final stage. A FIFA.com article hailed Clarke as "the wizard of the dribble." She made her senior debut in March 2009, against South Africa in the Cyprus Cup, as a second-half substitute for Karen Carney. Clarke then scored in only her second appearance, the third goal in a 3–0 win over Scotland.

In August 2009 she was named in coach Hope Powell's squad for Euro 2009. Clarke made her first competitive start in the semi-final win over the Netherlands, as manager Hope Powell utilised the 20-year–old's pace and energy to tire the Dutch full–backs, before introducing substitute Karen Carney to decisive effect.

Clarke continued to be selected during England's 2011 FIFA World Cup qualification campaign, contributing two goals in an 8–0 win over Malta. In a World Cup warm–up friendly against the United States, Clarke opened the scoring in England's 2–1 win at Brisbane Road. June 2012 saw Clarke named as one of four reserves to the 18-player Great Britain squad for the 2012 London Olympics. Her absence from the main squad was attributed to injury and loss of form.

After attending UEFA Women's Euro 2013 as a squad player, Clarke was overlooked by new head coach Mark Sampson for the first six months of his reign before being recalled in May 2014. Clarke was disappointed to be left out of England's squad for the 2015 FIFA Women's World Cup, where they finished third. But she vowed to bounce back: "As an athlete you have to take those knocks. It is how you come back from it and learn from it."

International goals
Scores and results list England's goal tally first.

Personal life
In addition to playing for Leeds Carnegie Ladies, in September 2009 Clarke enrolled at Leeds Metropolitan University as a student, along with teammates Carly Telford and Sue Smith. She had previously attended the FA Player Development Centre at Loughborough University. Clarke went to Grimes Dyke Primary School followed by John Smeaton High School in Leeds and was brought up by her single mother, Carol Stapleton.

References

External links

 
 Jessica Clarke  at The Football Association website

1989 births
Living people
English women's footballers
Notts County L.F.C. players
Leeds United Women F.C. players
Liverpool F.C. Women players
Black British sportswomen
England women's international footballers
FA Women's National League players
Women's Super League players
Footballers from Leeds
Women's association football wingers
Women's association football forwards
Leeds City Vixens L.F.C. players
2011 FIFA Women's World Cup players
Sheffield United W.F.C. players
England women's youth international footballers
Women's Championship (England) players